This is an incomplete list of ghost towns in Maine.

 Appledore
 Askwith
 Flagstaff (submerged to form Flagstaff Lake)
 Perkins Township (Swan Island)
 Ligonia Village (South Portland)
 Riceville (Township 39, Hancock County)

Notes and references

 
Maine
Ghost towns